Ivica Džolan (born 11 October 1988) is a Croatian footballer who plays for Novaki mainly as a central defender.

Club career
Džolan kicked off his career with the youth academy of Dinamo Zagreb and in 2007 joined NK Zagreb. After failing to make regular appearances for the side, he moved to second-tier club Rudeš in 2013. While at Rudeš, he attracted the interest of Dutch club Heerenveen.

After having played a friendly match for Osijek, Džolan signed for the Prva HNL side and penned a two-year contract on 7 July 2015. On 8 August 2016, he scored his only goal for the club in the 87th minute of a league match against Lokomotiva which saw Osijek win the match by 3–2.

In March 2017, NK Osijek announced by their official website that Džolan's contract was terminated by mutual consent after he was deemed surplus by manager Zoran Zekić. Subsequently, he headed abroad for the first time and signed for Icelandic club Fjölnir. He scored 2 goals in 19 league matches for Fjölnir.

References

External links 

1988 births
Living people
People from Prozor-Rama
Association football central defenders
Croatian footballers
Croatia youth international footballers
NK Zagreb players
NK Rudeš players
NK Osijek players
Croatian Football League players
First Football League (Croatia) players
Úrvalsdeild karla (football) players
Ungmennafélagið Fjölnir players
Croatian expatriate footballers
Expatriate footballers in Iceland
Croatian expatriate sportspeople in Iceland